Richard 'Richie' James Thomas (born 18 June 1942) is a former Welsh cricketer.  Thomas was a right-handed batsman who bowled right-arm medium pace.  He was born at Griffithstown, Monmouthshire.

Thomas made his debut for Glamorgan in a List-A match in the 1969 John Player League against Derbyshire.  This was Thomas' only List-A appearance for the county.  Five years later, he made his first-class debut for Glamorgan in the County Championship against Lancashire, which was also his only first-class appearance for the county.

References

External links
Richie Thomas at Cricinfo
Richie Thomas at CricketArchive

1942 births
Living people
Sportspeople from Pontypool
Welsh cricketers
Glamorgan cricketers